is a Japanese children's comedy manga series written and illustrated by Haruko Tachiiri. Serial numbers were very short, usually no more than four pages, and were collected in a total of 12 bound volumes under Shogakukan's Ladybird Comics imprint. Panku Ponk received the 1984 Shogakukan Manga Award for the children's category. It was licensed in English in North America by Studio Ironcat before they eventually went out of business.

Characters
 is the protagonist of the series. He is an oversized rabbit, big enough to be mistaken for a pig. He is Bonnie's michevious pet who likes to eat carrots.
 is the leader of the punk girls at elementary school, with a fondness for fighting. She has a habit of eating snacks at lunch, even though this upsets her stomach.
 is Bonnie's boyfriend and a talented inventor. However, he is usually teased by Bonnie and her group, making his personality change erratically.
 is Bonnie's mother. She is a full-time housewife with a talent for housework. She frequently has to reprimand Bonnie when she gets a zero on tests.
 is Bonnie's father. He is a senior post office worker and a heavy smoker.
 is a giant hamster who escapes his alcoholic, bachelor owner to follow Panku around.
 is Chamo's girlfriend. She has a friendly personality and aims to be a hairdresser.
 is the owner of the town's pediatric hospital. He is nicknamed "Mambo" because of his fondness for the mambo dance.

References

External links

Adventure anime and manga
Comedy anime and manga
Children's manga
1983 manga
Shogakukan manga
Shōjo manga
Winners of the Shogakukan Manga Award for children's manga